The 1988 Campeonato Brasileiro Série B was the 10th edition of the Campeonato Brasileiro Série B. The championship was disputed by 24 clubs divided into four groups of six teams. The four top teams in each group would qualify for the second phase, formed by 16 teams divided into four groups. The top two placed teams in each group would qualify, and the same process would repeat in the next phases, also divided into groupus of four. as in the first level, wins were worth three points, and any match that ended tied went to penalties, with the winner of the penalty shootout gaining two points and the loser one point. The champion and the runner-up would qualify to the finals and be promoted to the 1989 Série A. 
Inter de Limeira came in first in the final group, with Ponte Preta coming in second. However, since the tiebreaking criteria were unclear, Náutico contested Ponte Preta's promotion, claiming that the first tiebreaking criterion was the number of wins in the whole tournament and not the number of wins in the final phase. CBF decided to award the promotion and spot in the finals to Náutico. Inter de Limeira eventually beat Náutico in the finals.

First phase

Group C

Group D

Group E

Group F

Second phase

Group G

Group H

Group I

Group J

Third phase

Group K

Group L

Final group

Finals

Sources

Campeonato Brasileiro Série B seasons